In the Philippines, a handful of superstitious beliefs exist that are very famous amongst the natives. These beliefs are typically introduced to them at a very early age through children's books or bedtime stories. It is believed that if natives aren't careful to follow them, a curse will befall them.

Superstitious beliefs

Knocking on wood 
An action Filipinos do to counter a negative remark. For example, if a friend were to say “I might get hit by a car while crossing the road”, wood has to be knocked to avoid it from happening.

Tabi-tabi po 
A common phrase said out loud when passing through dwellings of spirits, such as cemeteries or haunted grasslands. It is a way to show respect and avoid disturbing spirits and other mythical creatures who live in these areas.

Pagpag 
When coming from a wake, a Filipino practice would be not to go home straight away as it is believed that the soul of the dead would follow one back to his/her house. One may stop anywhere one pleases as long as one does not go straight home.

Filipino folklore

Kapre 
Kapres are described as giants that usually sit atop tall trees smoking cigars.

Tikbalang 
The Tikbalang is described as a horse with human-like features said to lurk in the mountains and forests.

Tiyanak 
Tiyanaks are believed to be unborn babies that take on the form of a newborn baby monster in distress to attract people towards them.

Nuno sa punso 
Nuno sa punso is described to have dwarf-like features that dwell in mounds.

Manananggal, Aswang, and Tiktik  
Aswangs are one of the most feared monsters in the Philippines. They are shape-shifting, flesh-eating monsters that can blend in with the townspeople during the day, but prey on them at night. The manananggal and tiktik commonly prey on pregnant women. These creatures are known for having a long tongue used to suck out the blood of the woman and snatch the fetus in their bellies.

Diwata 
Diwata is a deity or spirit which appears as human beings who live in different parts of nature. They are believed to be beautiful and compassionate creatures, which is why Filipinos often say that they are like diwatas. They are also higher beings who lead their people and give fortune.

Filipino witchcraft

Pagkukulam 
A Filipino witch or mangkukulam is a person who casts spells, curses, or black magic on the people they want to take revenge on. This practice involves the use of a voodoo doll and a needle along with their candle-lighting rituals and anything performed on the doll will also be felt by the victim.

Gayuma 
Gayuma is considered to be a type of magic meant to charm or attract someone, this usually manifests itself in the form of a love potion.

Albularyo 
Albularyo or faith healers are very common in the Philippines, especially in the rural areas. They use herbs as their main healing instrument. Their healing prowess is said to be very powerful as they heal their patients with the use of their bare hands accompanied by various chants, rituals, and prayers.

Sources 

 
 
 
 
 

 Superstitions of the Philippines
 Superstitions of Asia